Fred 04 (born in Jaboatão dos Guararapes, Pernambuco, on July 11, 1965)  is the leader, singer, guitarist and Cavaquinho player of Brazilian band Mundo Livre S/A. He is the co-author, along with DJ Renato L, of the Mangue Bit manifesto, "Caranguejos Com Cérebros" ("Crabs With Brains"). He  has a degree in journalism. He made up his nickname '04' after the two last digits in his identity document.

References

External links
 Mundo Livre S/A official page

1965 births
Living people
20th-century Brazilian male singers
20th-century Brazilian singers
21st-century Brazilian male singers
21st-century Brazilian singers
Brazilian male guitarists
People from Jaboatão dos Guararapes
21st-century conductors (music)